is a Japanese synthwave band founded by Emi Kusano and BelleMaison Sekine in 2013. Their music and style are influenced by classic J-pop artists such as Pink Lady, Minako Honda, Chisato Moritaka, Yoko Minamino, Yū Hayami, and Seiko Matsuda, as well as synthwave and new-age artists such as Jan Hammer, Cusco, and Tangerine Dream.

History 
In 2012, Emi Kusano was watching reruns of the 1980s Japanese comedy series , which inspired her to write songs and create a musical project. A mutual friend at her university introduced her to BelleMaison Sekine. One year later, Kusano sent Sekine an a cappella demo of her song "Jack Doushi", which eventually became Satellite Young's debut single in 2014. Tele Hideo joined the duo in 2015 as a "media technologist", handling the production of the band's music videos and sometimes appearing on stage as a dancer or drummer. Now a trio, Satellite Young released their first EP and music video "Dividual Heart".

In 2016, the band recorded "Don't Graduate Senpai" for the Swedish retro anime Senpai Club. In addition, they collaborated with Mitch Murder to record the single "Sniper Rouge".

In 2017, Satellite Young released their self-titled debut album and their second EP Modern Romance. In addition, the band performed at the 2017 South by Southwest Music Festival.

On October 14, 2020, Kusano released her solo single "Glass Ceiling" under the pseudonym "Emi Satellite". Produced by London-based musician Skytopia and inspired by the 2019 South Korean film Kim Ji-young: Born 1982, the song focuses on the hardships and inequalities of women in East Asia.

Members 
  – lead vocals, lyrics, music (2013–present)
  – music, arrangement (2013–present)
  – stage production (2015–present)

Discography

Singles 
  (January 30, 2014)
  (May 20, 2014)
 "Geeky Boyfriend" (December 16, 2014)
 "Break! Break! Tic! Tac!" (December 16, 2014)
  (January 11, 2016)
 "Sniper Rouge" (Mitch Murder & Satellite Young) (February 15, 2016)
  (March 16, 2018)
 "Singing Dream" (April 20, 2018)
 "Moment in Slow Motion" (November 2, 2018)
 "Take On Me" (December 5, 2018)
  (June 13, 2019)

Albums 
 Satellite Young (April 5, 2017)

Mini albums 
 Dividual Heart (October 16, 2015)
 Modern Romance (November 20, 2017)
 Sanfransokyo Girl (February 19, 2018)

Other releases 
 "Glass Ceiling" (October 14, 2020) - Emi Satellite solo single

References

External links 
 
 
 

Japanese pop music groups
Japanese electronic music groups
Musical groups from Tokyo
Musical groups established in 2013
Synthwave groups
2013 establishments in Japan